C/o Kancharapalem (spelt as Care of Kancharapalem) is a 2018 Telugu-language slice of life anthology film written and directed by debutant Venkatesh Maha. It is produced by American filmmaker Praveena Paruchuri and distributed by Rana Daggubati under the banner of Suresh Productions. The film features a cast of over 80 non-actors, most of them native to Kancharapalem, a neighbourhood of Visakhapatnam where the film is set. The plot follows four uncoventional love stories parallelly, all set in the neighbourhood of Kancharapalem.

C/o Kancharapalem premiered in May 2018 at the New York Indian Film Festival, The film was released theatrically in India on 7 September 2018. The film received positive reviews from the audience and a majority of the film critics. The film received the Best Critic Movie award at 2019 Zee Cine Awards Telugu. It was also screened at the Indian Film Festival of Melbourne. It was honored with "Best Film Award" at the "Critics' Choice Festival of Indian films" in Mumbai, the "Caleidoscope Indian Film Festival" in Boston, where in the lead actor Subba Rao received the "Best Actor" honor, and Film Companion's "25 Best Telugu Films of the Decade". The film was remade in Tamil as C/o Kaadhal (2021) and in Kannada as Monsoon Raga (2022).

Plot 
The story focuses on four couples cutting across age, religion, caste and class barrier in the small town of Kancharapalem near Visakhapatnam. It also shows how life and time plays a significant role in the fate of the four couples who break social norms for the sake of love.

Cast

Production

Development 
The idea of C/o Kancherapalem struck director Maha while he was visiting an old friend living in the neighbourhood of Kancharapalem. After interacting with the local people and closely observing their lifestyle, Maha decided to make an independent film about the locality and its people.

Maha later happened to meet Praveena Paruchuri, an Indian American cardiologist who was looking to make a film in India. Maha showed Parachuri a pitch video of his story, for which she was instantly impressed and told him, "This is made for Cannes." Parachuri offered to produce the film and paid Maha  as an initial amount.

Casting 
Maha recruited most of his cast, nearly 80 non-actors, who are from the town itself. While no one in the town took seriously that he was making a film, they had shown great enthusiasm to act nonetheless. Maha also cast Paruchuri for a role when she flew down from U.S. to visit the sets.

Principal photography 
The film was shot for 62 days over two schedules in Kancharapalem and Bheemili suburbs of Visakhapatnam.

Post production 
Post production work of the film is done at Ramanaidu Studios where its owner D. Suresh Babu happened to watch the film. Babu acquired the distribution rights of the film immediately.

Soundtrack 
The soundtrack and background score was scored by Sweekar Agasthi, and the audio was released on 8 September 2018 on Aditya Music.

Release 
The film premiered at the New York Indian Film Festival in May 2018.

Reception 
Sangeetha Devi Dundoo of The Hindu called it a "small film with a large heart", further appreciating it by remarking "a rare Telugu film that takes us beyond the habitual cinematic settings to familiarize us with the sights, sounds and lives of people of a locality."

Baradwaj Rangan of Film Companion South reviewed, "A deeply moving romantic drama," and added "The format may suggest we are watching Love, Actually set in a village, in the midst of “what will people say?” considerations and drunks singing a Telugu song to the tune of Gori tera gaon bada pyara. But C/o Kancharapalem is a slow burn that builds and builds, and it goes far beyond the Love, Actually template. Yes, it’s cute and charming and very funny. But it’s also… real. [...] There’s a lot of mindfulness in the writing.[...] It’s been a while since a film showed us a side of love that’s so expansive, so generous, so attuned to the fact that love means… not just romantic love."

Srivathsan Nadadhur of The Times of India rated it a "4/5" and reviewed, "C/O Kancharapalem raises a toast to sincere, uncinematic storytelling, gives power to those unheard regional voices and does its part in undoing the stereotypical portrayal of community-specific stories in Telugu cinema."

Box office 
At the US Box office, the film collected $36,000 on its first day, and $185,000 in the opening weekend.

By the end of theatrical run, C/o Kancharapalem grossed of ₹7 crore worldwide.

Remakes
The film was remade in Tamil and Kannada as C/O Kaadhal and Monsoon Raaga respectively. The Tamil version was directed by debutant, Hemambar Jasti.

Awards and nominations

Notes

References

External links 

 

2018 films
Social realism in film
Films shot in Visakhapatnam
Films shot in Andhra Pradesh
Indian romantic drama films
Films about Indian Americans
Indian avant-garde and experimental films
Indian independent films
2010s avant-garde and experimental films
Slice of life films
Indian anthology films
Films about poverty in India
Films set in India
2010s Telugu-language films
Films about courtesans in India
Telugu films remade in other languages
2018 directorial debut films